The Women's 50 metre rifle three positions event at the 2008 Olympic Games took place on August 14 at the Beijing Shooting Range Hall.

The event consisted of two rounds: a qualifier and a final. In the qualifier, each shooter fired 60 shots with a .22 Long Rifle at 50 metres distance. 20 shots were fired each from the standing, kneeling, and prone positions. Scores for each shot were in increments of 1, with a maximum score of 10.

The top 8 shooters in the qualifying round moved on to the final round. There, they fired an additional 10 shots, all from the standing position. These shots scored in increments of .1, with a maximum score of 10.9. The total score from all 70 shots was used to determine final ranking.

Records
Prior to this competition, the existing world and Olympic records were as follows.

Qualification round

EOR Equalled Olympic record – KN Kneeling position – PR Prone position – Q Qualified for final – ST Standing position

Final

OR Olympic record

Shooting at the 2008 Summer Olympics
Olymp
Women's events at the 2008 Summer Olympics
Women's 050m 3 positions 2008